Bayou Country Superfest is a country music festival that has recently been held Memorial Day weekend at Tiger Stadium in Baton Rouge, Louisiana. The 2019 festival returned to Baton Rouge for the 10th Anniversary event on May 25 and 26. Since debuting on May 29, 2010, Bayou Country Superfest has brought together some of the biggest stars in music for a local celebration that began on the campus of Louisiana State University. The festival has included artists such as Taylor Swift, Kenny Chesney, Keith Urban, Carrie Underwood, Miranda Lambert, Brooks & Dunn, Sugarland, Zac Brown Band, Tim McGraw, Luke Bryan, Lady Antebellum, Reba McEntire, George Strait, Jason Aldean, and Blake Shelton.  

Bayou Country's expanded schedule in 2014 allowed for the event's largest attendance to date with 135,000 attendees. The festival had an attendance of 125,000 in 2015 and 100,000 in 2016. Due to construction conflicts  with Tiger Stadium, the 2017 and 2018 festivals took place at the Mercedes-Benz Superdome in New Orleans.

On January 27, 2020, it was announced that the event was on an indefinite hiatus.

2010

2011

2012

2013

2014

2015

2016

2019

See also 

Louisiana State University
Baton Rouge, Louisiana

References

External links 
 Official website
Bayou Country Superfest landing page for visitors to Baton Rouge
Bayou Country Superfest Facebook page

Music festivals in Louisiana
Country music festivals in the United States
Annual events in Louisiana